Manoa Seru Nakausabaria Kamikamica is a Fijian politician and cabinet minister who has served as the Deputy Prime Minister of Fiji since 24 December 2022. He is also a member of the People's Alliance serving as deputy party leader.

Early career and education 
Kamikamica attended the University of New South Wales in 1989 and graduated with a BComm degree in Accounting and Information Systems. He joined Fiji Airways and worked as General Manager for Finance and Strategic Planning for 13 years. He then launched and ran the airline's domestic subsidiary, Fiji Link playing a lead role from the acquisition of Sunair.

In December 2016, Kamikamica was appointed as the head of the ANZ Bank in Tonga. He previously served with ANZ Bank in Papua New Guinea for six years, starting off as Chief Financial Officer and then Associate Director in International Banking. Prior in entering politics, Kamikamica worked as Chief Financial Officer and General Manager at Lyndhurst Group of Companies.

Political career 
In April 2022, Kamikamica was appointed as deputy party leader of the People's Alliance led by Sitiveni Rabuka. He ran for the 2022 Fijian general elections and was able to secure a seat. His party won 21 seats and formed a coalition government with the National Federation Party (NFP) and the Social Democratic Liberal Party (SODELPA). On 24 December 2022, he was appointed Deputy Prime Minister of Fiji and Minister for External Trade Cooperatives and SMEs.

On 20 January 2023 following Rabuka's two days state visit to Kiribati, Kamikamica was named Acting Prime Minister.

References 

Living people
University of New South Wales alumni
People's Alliance (Fiji) politicians
Members of the Parliament of Fiji
Trade ministers of Fiji
Deputy Prime Ministers of Fiji
Year of birth missing (living people)